Ferguson is a city in Marshall County, Iowa, United States. The population was 97 at the time of the 2020 census.

History
Ferguson was founded in 1882.

Geography
Ferguson is located at  (41.937460, -92.865004).

Demographics

2010 census
As of the census of 2010, there were 126 people, 55 households, and 38 families living in the city. The racial makeup of the city was 98.4% White and 1.6% from two or more races.

There were 55 households, of which 21.8% had children under the age of 18 living with them, 41.8% were married couples living together, 16.4% had a female householder with no husband present, 10.9% had a male householder with no wife present, and 30.9% were non-families. 20.0% of all households were made up of individuals, and 10.9% had someone living alone who was 65 years of age or older. The average household size was 2.29 and the average family size was 2.61.

The median age in the city was 51 years. 19% of residents were under the age of 18; 5.7% were between the ages of 18 and 24; 16% were from 25 to 44; 44.4% were from 45 to 64; and 15.1% were 65 years of age or older. The gender makeup of the city was 46.0% male and 54.0% female.

2000 census
As of the census of 2000, there were 126 people, 55 households, and 36 families living in the city. The racial makeup of the city was 96.83% White and 3.17% Native American. Hispanic or Latino of any race were 0.79% of the population.

There were 55 households, out of which 21.8% had children under the age of 18 living with them, 43.6% were married couples living together, 16.4% had a female householder with no husband present, and 34.5% were non-families. 29.1% of all households were made up of individuals, and 10.9% had someone living alone who was 65 years of age or older. The average household size was 2.29 and the average family size was 2.83.

In the city, the population was spread out, with 23.8% under the age of 18, 4.8% from 18 to 24, 21.4% from 25 to 44, 34.9% from 45 to 64, and 15.1% who were 65 years of age or older. The median age was 44 years. For every 100 females, there were 100.0 males. For every 100 females age 18 and over, there were 95.9 males.

The median income for a household in the city was $40,893, and the median income for a family was $46,250. Males had a median income of $42,083 versus $22,250 for females. The per capita income for the city was $22,777. There were 4.4% of families and 4.3% of the population living below the poverty line, including 15.4% of under eighteens and none of those over 64.

Education
East Marshall Community School District serves the community. The district was established on July 1, 1992 by the merger of the LDF and SEMCO school districts.

References

External links

 
City-Data Comprehensive statistical data and more about Ferguson

Cities in Iowa
Cities in Marshall County, Iowa